Castle Park, formerly Castle Amusement Park, is a 25-acre amusement park and family amusement center located in Riverside, California. The park utilizes a medieval "castle" theme and includes attractions such as a miniature golf course, arcade, and 22 amusement rides including two roller coasters such as Merlin's Revenge, a junior rollercoaster, and Screamin' Demon, a spinning Wild Mouse rollercoaster. The main "castle" themed building, houses the arcade as well as its only dark ride, "Ghost Blasters", an interactive attraction, designed by Sally Corporation, which can also be found at other amusement parks throughout North America. The park was designed, built and operated by Bud Hurlbut, who designed several rides at Knott's Berry Farm.  Castle Park is currently owned and operated by Palace Entertainment.

History
The park opened in 1976 as a Family entertainment center, featuring a castle themed building housing a large two level video game arcade, and an outdoor miniature golf course. In 1985, the park expanded by adding an adjacent amusement ride area, featuring a collection of classic rides such as a Dentzel carousel built in 1905, a miniature railroad, and a log flume ride, thus becoming a legitimate amusement park.

In 1999, the park opened Ghost Blasters, an interactive dark ride designed by Sally Corporation. The ride features laser guns which riders use to shoot at targets to accumulate points. The attraction is the park's first and only dark ride, and occupies the entire second floor of the former arcade area inside the main castle building, reducing the arcade to only the first floor.

In 2008, the park opened "Dragon Flyer", a spinning flat ride, and "Screamin' Demon", a spinning wild mouse rollercoaster.

On May 25, 2019, A woman was critically injured and her husband and child suffered less-severe injuries when the log ride malfunctioned and threw them into the water. The guests recovered mostly from their injuries.

Attractions
Rides:
Antique Car Ride
Bumper Cars
Castle Park Railroad - A  narrow gauge railroad.
Crazy Plane - A rotating "bus" ride.
Dragon Flyer - A "flying" ride.
Dragons Tower - A vertical drop ride.
Fireball - A looping ride. (Reopening soon as a wheelchair ramp is currently being built)
Flying Animals - A "Dumbo" style flat ride.
Flying Saucer - A spinning gravity ride (A Gravitron).
Ghost Blasters - An interactive Dark ride located in the arcade.
Kings Crown - A swing ride.
Log Ride - (Under Refurbishment)
Merlin's Revenge - A junior rollercoaster. 
Merry-Go-Round - A Dentzel Carousel built in 1907.
Riverside Express - A  gauge ridable miniature train ride.
Rockin' Tug
Scrambler
Screamin' Demon
Sea Dragon - A swinging ship.
Sea planes - A children's flat ride.
Spaceships - A children's flat ride.
Spider - A spinning twirling ride.
Tilt-a-Whirl
Whip - A centrifugal ride.
Wiggle Racers

Other Attractions:
Buccaneer Cove -  A water play area.
Arcade - A video game arcade also housing the "Ghost Blasters" attraction.
Miniature Golf - An 18-hole miniature golf course area.
Anthony The Magic - A magic show
The Big Top - A private parties facility.

Former Attractions:
Little Dipper - A children's rollercoaster.
Motorcycles
Falling Star - A rotating pendulum ride
Thunderbolt
Trabant
Ferris Wheel
Tornado Coaster - Zamperla Powered Kiddie Coaster
Cyclone Racer - Musik Express
Samba - A children's helicopter ride.
Go Karts - Was originally part of the "Big Top" area. Its former site is now occupied by "Screamin' Demon".

References

External links 
 

Amusement parks in California
Palace Entertainment
Tourist attractions in Riverside, California
Buildings and structures in Riverside, California
1976 establishments in California